The women's high jump event was part of the track and field athletics programme at the 1928 Summer Olympics. It was the first appearance of the event, one of five events that marked the debut of women's Olympic athletics in 1928. The competition was held on Sunday, August 5, 1928. Twenty high jumpers from nine nations competed.

Records
These were the standing world and Olympic records (in metres) prior to the 1928 Summer Olympics.

(*) unofficial

In the final Ethel Catherwood set a new official world record with 1.595 metres.

Results

The qualification started at 1.15 p.m. The top 12 and ties and all those clearing the qualification height of 1.40 metres qualified for the final. The jumping order and the jumping series are not available. Only the Romanian Irina Orendi was unable to clear 1.40 metres, which means that nineteen high jumpers competed in the final. The final started at 2.30 p.m. on the same day. The jumping order is not available and the jumping series are only known for the medalists.

References

External links
Olympic Report
 

High jump
High jump at the Olympics
1928 in women's athletics
Ath